Silvano Meli (born 11 August 1960) is a Swiss former alpine skier.

World Cup results
Podium

References

External links
 

1960 births
Living people
Swiss male alpine skiers